Phạm Nhật Vượng (born 5 August 1968) is a Vietnamese property developer and Vietnam's first billionaire. He is the founder and chairman of Vingroup.

Personal life 
Vượng was born on 5 August 1968 in Hanoi; his paternal family has origins in Hà Tĩnh in north-central Vietnam. His father served in the Vietnamese Army's air defence division, and his mother had a tea shop, which left the family with a very meager income. He grew up in Hanoi and graduated from Kim Lien High School in 1985.

In 1987, he entered Hanoi University of Mining and Geology and was sent to Russia to study in the Moscow Geological Prospecting Institute, for which he was able to obtain a scholarship thanks to his profound mathematical aptitude. He graduated from this university in 1992.

After graduating, he married Phạm Thu Hương, whom he had known since high school, and moved to Kharkiv, Ukraine.

The couple has 3 children: Phạm Nhật Quân Anh - current Deputy General Director of Vinpearl Company Limited, Phạm Nhật Minh Hoàng and Phạm Nhật Minh Anh.

Career as an entrepreneur
In the 1990s, while living in Ukraine, Pham Nhat Vuong started an instant noodle restaurant business using money borrowed from friends and family. Soon he also started producing and selling instant noodles.

In 1993, he founded Technocom, which would become a market leader in dehydrated culinary products in Ukraine. Vượng sold Technocom to Nestlé for $150 million in 2009, before returning to Vietnam.

Vượng's first projects in Vietnam were Vinpearl Resort Nha Trang (opened in 2003) and Vincom City Towers (later renamed Vincom Ba Trieu) in central Hanoi (opened in 2004). Vincom went public in 2007. It merged with Vinpearl, Vượng's luxury resort business, to form VinGroup in 2007. VinGroup is headquartered in its Riverside township in Long Biên District in Eastern Hanoi.

In 2015, Vượng was listed as the richest person in Vietnam with assets totaling VNĐ 24.3 trillion (approximately US$1.1 billion), which more than quadrupled those of the second richest person, Trần Đình Long of Hanoi Hoa Phat Corporation. His wife, Phạm Thu Hương and sister-in-law Phạm Thúy Hằng ranked third and fifth respectively. As of 12 April 2021, Forbes estimated his net worth to be US$9 Billion.

References 

Vietnamese businesspeople
1968 births
Living people
Vietnamese billionaires
Vietnamese business executives
Vingroup
Vietnamese expatriates in Ukraine
Vietnamese company founders
Real estate and property developers
People from Hanoi